Dairis Bertāns (born September 9, 1989) is a Latvian professional basketball player for Real Betis of the Spanish Liga ACB. Bertāns also plays for the Latvia national basketball team. He is the older brother of Dāvis Bertāns.

Professional career

Latvia (2004–2013)
From 2004 to 2006, Bertāns played for Valmiera and its junior team. In 2006, he signed with ASK Rīga. In 2006–07, he played for ASK Rīga's junior team, and in 2007–08, made his debut for the senior squad.

In March 2009, he left ASK Rīga following the club's financial difficulties and signed a two-year deal with Ventspils.

In August 2010, he signed a two-year deal with VEF Rīga. VEF Rīga's coach at the time, Rimas Kurtinaitis, saw potential in Bertāns as a point guard despite primarily being a shooting guard. So, during the 2010–11 season, Bertāns developed point guard skills to a different level, and was one of the key factors in VEF Rīga's first championship.

In July 2012, he re-signed with VEF Rīga on a three-year deal.

Bilbao Basket (2013–2016)
In June 2013, Bertāns parted ways with VEF Rīga to sign a three-year deal with Bilbao Basket of the Liga ACB. In one of his first games with Bilbao he scored 19 points in a preseason game against Philadelphia 76ers.

In July 2014, Bertāns joined the Boston Celtics for the 2014 NBA Summer League.

In his second season with Bilbao, Bertāns helped the team to reach the 2015 ACB Playoffs as the fifth seed, but they eventually lost to Valencia in the Quarterfinals.

In July 2015, Bertāns joined the San Antonio Spurs for the 2015 NBA Summer League, where he averaged 11.3 points, 3 rebounds and 1.6 in three games played for the Spurs.

On January 20, 2016, Bertāns recorded a season-high 27 points, shooting 6-of-11 from three-point range, along with four rebounds and two assists in a 76-78 loss to Bayern Munich.

Darüşşafaka (2016–2017)
On July 13, 2016, Bertāns signed a 1+1-year deal with Turkish club Darüşşafaka Doğuş under head coach David Blatt. On January 12, 2017, Bertāns recorded a career-high 29 points, shooting 10-of-13 from the field, along with five assists in a 98–89 win over Baskonia. Bertāns helped the team to reach the 2017 EuroLeague Playoffs as the eighth seed, but they eventually were eliminated by Real Madrid in the Quarterfinals.

Olimpia Milano (2017–2019)
On July 10, 2017, Bertāns signed with Italian club Olimpia Milano. In his first season with Milano, Bertāns helped Milano to win the 2018 Italian League championship.

On June 29, 2018, Bertāns re-signed with Milano for the 2018–19 season. However, on March 1, 2019, Bertāns parted ways with Milano so he can continue the season in the NBA.

New Orleans Pelicans (2019)
On March 2, 2019, Bertāns signed with the New Orleans Pelicans. Bertāns later made his NBA debut eight days later, recording just one assist in six minutes of action in a 128–116 loss to the Atlanta Hawks. He then recorded a rebound two days later in a 130–113 loss to the Milwaukee Bucks. He made his first basket with a three-pointer in a 138–136 overtime loss to the Phoenix Suns on March 16. On July 7, 2019, he was waived by the Pelicans.

Khimki (2019–2021)
On July 8, 2019, Bertāns signed a two-year contract with Khimki, reuniting with the head coach Rimas Kurtinaitis. He played in 21 out of 28 Euroleague games and BC Khimki won 13 games, placing them 7th place in the standings, which would qualify the team to playoffs. On May 25, 2020, Euroleague Basketball cancelled its competitions due to the COVID-19 pandemic.

Real Betis (2021–present)
On July 27, 2021, Bertāns signed with Real Betis of the Liga ACB.

Career statistics

NBA

Regular season

|-
| style="text-align:left;"| 
| style="text-align:left;"| New Orleans
| 12 || 0 || 13.9 || .255 || .294 || - || .8 || .8 || .1 || .0 || 2.8
|- class="sortbottom"
| style="text-align:center;" colspan="2"| Career
| 12 || 0 || 13.9 || .255 || .294 || - || .8 || .8 || .1 || .0 || 2.8

EuroLeague

|-
| style="text-align:left;"| 2016–17
| style="text-align:left;"| Darüşşafaka
| 32 || 7 || 16.1 || .463 || .500 || .836 || .7 || 1.3 || .2 || .1 || 6.4 || 5.4
|-
| style="text-align:left;"| 2017–18
| style="text-align:left;" rowspan=2| Milano
| 28 || 4 || 18.4 || .417 || .409 || .857 || 1.0 || 1.4 || .4 || .1 || 7.1 || 5.3
|-
| style="text-align:left;"| 2018–19
| 22 || 11 || 16.6 || .479 || .536 || .824 || 1.0 || .6 || .7 || .0 || 6.4 || 5.1
|-
| style="text-align:left;"| 2019–20
| style="text-align:left;"| Khimki
| 21 || 7 || 16.5 || .438 || .429 || .800 || .6 || 1.1 || .3 || .1 || 4.6 || 3.1
|-class="sortbottom"
| colspan=2 style="text-align:center;"| Career
| 103 || 29 || 16.9 || .447 || .462 || .836 || .8 || 1.2 || .4 || .0 || 6.2 || 4.7

National team career
Bertāns has been member of the Latvian U-16, U-19 and U-20 national teams, as well as the senior national team. He led Latvia to a bronze medal at the 2007 U18 European Championship in Madrid, Spain. He has since represented the Latvia national team at the EuroBasket 2011. He was also the leading scorer (14.1ppg) for Latvia in 2012, when he helped Latvia earn a spot in EuroBasket 2013.

Bertāns was a key player for Latvia during EuroBasket 2013 where he averaged 10.9 ppg. In his best game of the tournament Dairis had a 28-point performance against eventual champs France.

He returned for EuroBasket 2015 and 2017, helping Latvia get to the quarterfinal round on both occasions.

Statistics

Personal life
Bertāns' brother, Dāvis, is also a professional basketball player. Their father, Dainis, was a professional basketball player and is currently a youth coach. Their mother is a sports teacher and a former high-level rower. In childhood Bertāns was raised in Latvian most northern town Rūjiena until his parents moved to capital city Rīga.

References

External links
 Dairis Bertāns at acb.com
 Dairis Bertāns at eurobasket.com
 Dairis Bertāns at euroleague.net

1989 births
Living people
ASK Riga players
Bilbao Basket players
BK VEF Rīga players
BK Ventspils players
Darüşşafaka Basketbol players
Latvian expatriate basketball people in Spain
Latvian expatriate basketball people in Turkey
Latvian expatriate basketball people in the United States
Latvian men's basketball players
Lega Basket Serie A players
Liga ACB players
National Basketball Association players from Latvia
New Orleans Pelicans players
Olimpia Milano players
People from Valmiera
People from Rūjiena
Real Betis Baloncesto players
Undrafted National Basketball Association players
Shooting guards